AT-8 may refer to: 
 AT-8, a World War II training aircraft
 AT-8 (Cuban mine), a Cuban anti-tank mine
 AT-8 Songster, an anti-tank missile